Craig Donald Thompson (born August 1, 1956) is an American athletic administrator. He became the commissioner of the Mountain West Conference (MW) upon the formation of that league in 1998 and served until retiring from that position at the end of 2022.

Thompson previously served as commissioner of the Sun Belt Conference from 1991 to 1998 and as the sole commissioner in the history of the American South Conference from 1987 to 1991. Thompson attended college at the University of Minnesota, graduating in 1978 with a bachelor's degree in journalism. After graduating from college, Thompson held several positions in public relations for Kansas State University, the NBA's Kansas City Kings and the Metro Conference. Thompson was named the first commissioner of the Mountain West Conference on October 15, 1998.

On September 14, 2022, Thompson announced that he would retire effective on December 31 of that year. The MW announced on November 11 that Thompson would be replaced by Gloria Nevarez, previously commissioner of the West Coast Conference.

References

External links
 MW biography

1956 births
Living people
People from Estherville, Iowa
Mountain West Conference commissioners
Sun Belt Conference commissioners
University of Minnesota School of Journalism and Mass Communication alumni